The Church of St. Peter in Walton, near Wetherby in West Yorkshire, England is an active Anglican parish church in the archdeaconry of Leeds and the Diocese of Leeds.

History
The church originates from the 12th century although most of the current structure dates from the 14th century with an extensive restoration undertaken between 1890 and 1891 to the plans of architect W.M. Fawcett. On 30 March 1966 it was registered as a Grade II* listed building.

Architectural style

The church is constructed of squared magnesian limestone with a graduated green slate roof.  The church has a west tower with a clock on its southern face, a three bay nave with a southern porch and a narrower two-bay chancel with a vestry to its northern side.  The tower is without buttresses, a small lancet window to its western side.

See also
List of places of worship in the City of Leeds
Grade II* listed buildings in West Yorkshire
Listed buildings in Walton, Leeds

References

External links

St. Peter, Walton

Churches in Leeds
Listed buildings in Leeds
Anglican Diocese of Leeds
Church of England church buildings in West Yorkshire
Grade II* listed churches in West Yorkshire